Terry Martin Lupton is a successful songwriter and producer based in Los Angeles.

His songwriting catalogue include almost 100 commercially published songs, due to the databases of BMI and ASCAP.

His work

He wrote songs for the following artists:

 1988 on the album "Apollonia" by Apollonia Kotero
 1989 on the album "The Party" by The Party
 1991 on the album "Michael Learns to Rock" by Michael Learns to Rock
 1992 on the album "Something Real" by Stephanie Mills 
 1993 on the album "Joey Lawrence" by Joey Lawrence 
 2000 on the album "Steamin'" by Scott Ellison
 2003 on the album "Bad Case of the Blues" by Scott Ellison
 2004 on the album "Everyday's Another Chance" by Jamie Stevens
 2005 on the album "All The Girls I Am" by Jeannie Kendall
 the song "Shine em up" by Keely Hawkes on the album "Shake it up"

References
 Visit Terry Lupton's Official Website at http://terrylupton.net

Record producers from California
Living people
Musicians from California
Year of birth missing (living people)
Place of birth missing (living people)
Songwriters from California